Aye Auto is a 1990 Indian Malayalam-language romantic comedy film written and directed by Venu Nagavalli and produced by Maniyanpilla Raju. The film stars Mohanlal and Rekha in the lead roles. The songs were composed by Raveendran, while Johnson provided the background score. The plot follows the life of auto drivers in the city of Kozhikode in Kerala. Aye Auto was the second highest-grossing Malayalam film of 1990 at the box office, behind His Highness Abdullah.

Plot

Sudhi is an auto-rickshaw driver who meets Meenakshi, the granddaughter of a well-off family. Sudhi and Meenakshi fall in love, but face strong opposition from her family, their only support being her grandfather, Krishna Pillai. The police, despite having the duty of protecting the law, start breaking it.

Cast
 Mohanlal as Sudhi, a poor but loving young gentlemen, an auto driver
 Rekha as Meenakshi ('Meenu'/'Meenukutty')
 Sreenivasan as Police Inspector
 Thikkurisi Sukumaran Nair as Retd. Banker Krishna Pillai ('Yechhi'Krishnan) Meenakshi's miser yet kind-hearted maternal grandfather
 K. B. Ganesh Kumar as Suresh
 Maniyanpilla Raju as Thangu
 Jagadish as Sreekrishnan
 Kuthiravattam Pappu as Haji Moidutty
 M. G. Soman as the wicked and corrupt Police Commissioner
 Mohan Jose as Dominic
 Shyama as Chithra, Police Commissioner's daughter and Meenakshi's friend
 Murali as Bhadran 
 Kunchan as Ramanan
 Kunjandi as Rashid Moopah
 Valsala Menon as College Principal
 Nandhu as Lonappan
 Adoor Pankajam as Pankachi
 Sukumari as Janaki, Krishna Pillai's wife and Meenakshi's maternal grandmother
 Keerikkadan Jose as a corrupt Police inspector, ally of Bhadran
 Ashokan as Sunnykutty, a kind young gentlemen 
 Santha Devi as Sunnykutty's mother
 Jomol as Student in the auto

Soundtrack 
The film score was composed by Johnson while the songs were composed by Raveendran.

Reception
Aye Auto widely received positive response and was the second highest-grossing Malayalam film of 1990 at the box office, behind His Highness Abdullah.

References

External links
 

1990 films
1990s Malayalam-language films
Indian romantic comedy films
Films shot in Kozhikode
Films directed by Venu Nagavally
Films scored by Raveendran